Oskar Lukasiak (born 27 October 1991) is a Swedish darts player.

Career

Oskar is the youngest player (age 12) to make a nine-darter on an official tournament, Denmark Open 2004, 29 August 2004 in the Boys Single. He accomplished the feat against PDC player Ron Meulenkamp in the last and deciding leg in last 8. He then won the boys title. The same weekend he beat few of the top players of BDO including Jarkko Komula from Finland and Shaun Greatbatch from England.

The same year he got an exemption to play Winmau World Youth Masters at the age of 12 (the minimum age was 13 before the rules changed). He beat Dutch darts player Jonny Nijs in the final 4-1 to become the first Swedish darts player ever to win Winmau World Masters.

The Swedish Darts Organisation made Oskar an honorary member.

In 2008 Oskar was selected to play with the Swedish Men's National Team at Nordic Cup at 16. He finished with the second highest average of all players, behind Komula. He reached the round of 16 in that year's Europe Cup.

In 2009 Oskar played his 7th time at Europe Cup Youth, taking the title by defeating Jamie Lewis from Wales. He also won the pairs tournament and overall. The Swedish team made it to the final of the team event. At the banquet Oskar was voted Most Valuable Player.

In 2012 Oskar won the Swedish qualifier of PDC World Youth Championship. At the tournament he beat James Hajdar, England by 5 legs to 1, then in last 32 he lost to Jamie Landon, England by 3 legs to 5.

In 2018 Oskar played in the PDC circuit.

External links
Oskar Lukasiak's profile and stats on Darts Database
2012 PDC World Youth Championship

References

1991 births
Living people
Swedish darts players
British Darts Organisation players
Sportspeople from Stockholm